The , was one of the world's largest indoor waterparks, located in Miyazaki, Japan. The Polynesia-themed Ocean Dome, which was part of the Sheraton Seagaia Resort, with the world's biggest retractable roof, which was opened and closed according to the weather conditions; 12,000 square metres of sandy beach, crushed from 600 tonnes of stones; an "ocean" six times larger than an Olympic pool, filled with 13,500 tonnes of unsalted, chlorinated water kept hot at 28°C, equipped with a wave-machine with 200 variations, and listed in the Guinness World Records "as the biggest simulated pool". This  resort in Miyazaki, on the southern island of Kyushu, boasts five hotels, several golf-courses, a botanical park and a zoo; but due to bankruptcy, the dome was later bought by Ripplewood, an American private-equity fund, in 2001 for 16.2 billion yen ($148 million USD), which was less than 10% of its construction costs of 200 billion yen ($1.8 billion USD). Ripplewood had also invested an additional 3.5 billion yen ($32 million USD) on renovations for the dome; but even after the remodeling of the resort, the hotel closed down with liabilities of 276 billion yen ($2.5 million USD). 

The Ocean Dome water park, which opened in 1993 along with the rest of the complex, was visited by 1.25 million people in the peak year of fiscal 1995. Other accommodations within the area include the Seaside Hotel Phoenix, the Sun Hotel Phoenix, and the Cottage Himuka, with 14 cottages in a wooded setting. Depending on the season, entrance cost for the simulated dome was ¥2600 ($21.17) for an adult and ¥1600 ($13.03) for a child. The water park was closed in 2007 by Phoenix Resort K.K. The Seagaia Ocean dome was demolished in 2017, a year after the hotel had received major renovations which did not include the dome.

Gallery

See also
 List of water parks

References

External links

 Phoenix Seagaia Resort homepage in English
 
 Ocean Dome Seagaia 1993 Japanese TV Commercial
 

Miyazaki (city)
Defunct amusement parks in Japan
Water parks in Japan
Buildings and structures in Miyazaki Prefecture
1993 establishments in Japan
2001 mergers and acquisitions
2007 disestablishments in Japan
Buildings and structures demolished in 2017
2017 disestablishments in Japan
Indoor amusement parks
Demolished buildings and structures in Japan